Rhys Cadwaladr (fl. 1666–1690) was a Welsh language poet and classical scholar, born in Conwy, north Wales.

Notes

1690 deaths
People from Conwy
Welsh-language poets
17th-century Welsh writers
17th-century male writers
17th-century Welsh poets
Year of birth unknown